Pleasure is a 2013 Swedish short film by Ninja Thyberg. The film tells the story of a girl Marie (played by Jenny Hutton) who agrees to perform a double-anal sex scene in a hard porn video in order to keep her job. The short tells about the darker side of the porn industry.

It won the "Semaine de la Critique" also known as the Canal + Award at the 2013 Cannes Film Festival and will be broadcast on Canal + in France. An extended version debuted at the Sundance Film Festival.

Thyberg adapted the short into a feature-length film, released in 2022 by NEON.

References

External links

 

2013 films
2013 drama films
2013 short films
Films about pornography
Swedish drama films
Swedish short films
2010s Swedish-language films
2010s Swedish films